Ichera ( or Ичёра) is an rural locality (rural-type settlement) in Kirensky District of Irkutsk Oblast, Russia. Population:

Geography
The village is located on the left bank of the Lena, a little upstream from the mouth of the Ichera.

See also
SPN-673 incident

References

Rural localities in Irkutsk Oblast
Populated places on the Lena River